A manhole (utility hole, maintenance hole, or sewer hole) is an opening to a confined space such as a shaft, utility vault, or large vessel. Manholes are often used as an access point for an underground public utility, allowing inspection, maintenance, and system upgrades. The majority of underground services have manholes, including water, sewers, telephone, electricity, storm drains, district heating, and gas.

Manholes are generally found in urban areas, in streets and occasionally under sidewalks. In rural and undeveloped areas, services such as telephone and electricity are usually carried on utility poles or even pylons rather than underground.

In Australia, manhole also commonly refers to an access hatch used to get access from a room or hallway into the ceiling cavity of a building. These manholes are typically around  square.

Construction 

Manhole closings are protected by a grating or manhole cover, a flat plug designed to prevent accidental or unauthorized access to the manhole. These covers are traditionally made of metal, but may be constructed from precast concrete, glass reinforced plastic or other composite materials (especially where cover theft is of concern). Because of legislation restricting acceptable manual handling weights, Europe has seen a move toward lighter-weight composite manhole cover materials, which also have the benefits of greater slip resistance and electrical insulating properties.

Manholes are usually outfitted with metal, polypropylene, or fiberglass steps installed in the inner side of the wall to allow easy descent into the utility space.

Manholes are usually round, primarily because roundness is the best shape to resist the compression of the earth; covers are round because they are easier to manufacture than square or rectangular shapes, they are easier to move by rolling, and they can't fall into the opening. But in the United Kingdom they are nearly always square, or rectangular, in shape, at least at street level. Manholes can also be found in a triangular shape (e.g. in Cambridge, UK, and surrounding villages).

Composite manholes 
Composite (fiberglass) manholes are commonly used in applications where infiltration, exfiltration, or corrosion by hydrogen sulfide (from sewer gas) are a concern, or where structures need to be factory integrated into a manhole before placement. In these manholes, the entire underground enclosure is constructed of some composite material, in addition to the cover.

Structures that can be integrated into composite manholes include:
 Flow inverts
 Flumes
 Drop structures from higher elevation flows to lower elevation discharge pipes
 Weirs
 Storm water screening structures
 Sewage grinders
 Energy absorbing structures to dissipate undesirable flow stream turbulence or velocity

Hazards caused by stray voltage in manholes 
In urban areas, stray voltage issues have become a significant concern for utilities. On January 16, 2004, Jodie S. Lane was electrocuted after stepping on a metal manhole cover, while walking her dog in New York City.

Gallery

See also 

 Manhole cover
 Packaged Metering Manhole

References 

 Isles, Paul (2010). "Dover Engineering Works". Dover Life Magazine

Further reading 
 

Public utilities
Subterranea (geography)
Street furniture
Sewerage